Griko, sometimes spelled Grico, is the dialect of Italiot Greek spoken by Griko people in Salento (province of Lecce) and (also called ) in Calabria. Griko and Standard Modern Greek are partially mutually intelligible.

Classification
The most popular hypothesis on the origin of Griko is the one by Gerhard Rohlfs and Georgios Hatzidakis, that Griko's roots go as far back in history as the time of the ancient Greek colonies in Southern Italy and Sicily in the eighth century BC. The Southern Italian dialect is thus considered to be the last living trace of the Greek elements that once formed Magna Graecia.

There are, however, competing hypotheses according to which Griko may have preserved some Doric elements, but its structure is otherwise mostly based on Koine Greek, like almost all other Modern Greek dialects. Thus, Griko should rather be described as a Doric-influenced descendant of Medieval Greek spoken by those who fled the Byzantine Empire to Italy trying to escape the Turks. The idea of Southern Italy's Greek dialects being historically derived from Medieval Greek was proposed for the first time in the 19th century by Giuseppe Morosi.

Geographic distribution

Two small Italiot Greek-speaking communities survive today in the Italian regions of Calabria (Metropolitan city of Reggio Calabria) and Apulia (Province of Lecce). The Italiot Greek-speaking area of Apulia comprises nine small towns in the Grecìa Salentina region (Calimera, Martano, Castrignano de' Greci, Corigliano d'Otranto, Melpignano, Soleto, Sternatia, Zollino, Martignano), with a total of 40,000 inhabitants. The Calabrian Greek region also consists of nine villages in Bovesia, (including Bova Superiore, Roghudi, Gallicianò, Chorìo di Roghudi and Bova Marina) and four districts in the city of Reggio Calabria, but its population is significantly smaller, with around only 2000 inhabitants.

Official status
By Law 482 of 1999, the Italian parliament recognized the Griko communities of Reggio Calabria and Salento as a Greek ethnic and linguistic minority. It states that the Republic protects the language and culture of its Albanian, Catalan, Germanic, Greek, Slovene and Croat populations and of those who speak French, Franco-Provençal, Friulian, Ladin, Occitan and Sardinian. According to UNESCO data from 2011, the two dialects of Griko are classified as severely endangered languages.

Culture
There is rich oral tradition and Griko folklore. Griko songs, music and poetry are particularly popular in Italy and Greece. Famous music groups from Salento include Ghetonia and Aramirè. Also, influential Greek artists such as Dionysis Savvopoulos and Maria Farantouri have performed in Griko. The Greek musical ensemble Encardia focuses on Griko songs as well as on the musical tradition of Southern Italy at large.

Samples

Phonology

See also
 Hellenic languages
 Calabrian Greek dialect
 Griko people

Notes and references

Further reading
 H. F. Tozer. "The Greek-Speaking Population of Southern Italy." The Journal of Hellenic Studies. Vol. 10 (1889), pp. 11–42.

External links
 On the Brink: Griko; A Language of Resistance and Celebration - Cultural Survival
 Glossa Grika o Griko Derentinò (in Griko, Italian, Standard-Greek and French)
 Enosi Griko, Coordination of Grecìa Salentina Associations (Italian, Greek and English)
  Pos Matome Griko (in Italian, Greek and English)
 Grecìa Salentina  official site (in Italian)
 Gaze On The Sea Salentine Peninsula, Greece and Greater Greece (in Italian, Greek and English)
 English-Griko dictionary
 Kalinifta, by Ghetonia
 Oria mou rodinedda, folk song of the Griko-speaking communities of southern Italy, by Eleni & Souzana Vougioukli

Varieties of Modern Greek
Magna Graecia
Languages of Apulia
Endangered diaspora languages
Endangered Indo-European languages
Greece–Italy relations